The 2020–21 SAFA Second Division (known as the ABC Motsepe League for sponsorship reasons) was the 23rd season of the SAFA Second Division, the third tier for South African association football clubs, since its establishment in 1998. Due to the size of South Africa, the competition was split into nine divisions, one for each region. After the league stage of the regional competition was completed, the nine winning teams of each regional division entered the playoffs.

Due to the COVID-19 pandemic in South Africa, divisions were divided into two streams, and all games were played behind closed doors.

Hungry Lions defeated Platinum City Rovers 5-4 on penalties, with both teams winning promotion to the 2021-22 National First Division. The teams earned R1 million and R500,000 respectively, with R200,000 and R100,000 being earmarked for youth development projects.

Regions

Eastern Cape

Stream A

Stream B

Free State

Stream A

Stream B

Gauteng

Stream A

Stream B

Kwazulu-Natal

Stream A

Stream B

Limpopo

Stream A

Stream B

Mpumalanga

Stream A

Stream B

North West

Stream A

Stream B

Northern Cape

South Stream

West Stream

Western Cape

References 

SAFA Second Division seasons
2020–21 in South African soccer leagues